Communist Party (Marxist–Leninist) of Panama (in Spanish: Partido Comunista (marxista-leninista) de Panamá), is a Maoist political party in Panamá. PC (ml)P was founded on January 9, 1980, by a group of militants of the Socialist Workers Front (marxist-leninist) (FOS (ml)).

PC (ml)P published Nueva Democracía (New Democracy) between 1980-2001.

1980 establishments in Panama
Communist parties in Panama
International Conference of Marxist–Leninist Parties and Organizations (International Newsletter)
International Coordination of Revolutionary Parties and Organizations
Maoist parties
Political parties established in 1980
Maoism in North America